In enzymology, a phospholipid-translocating ATPase is an enzyme that catalyzes the chemical reaction

ATP + H2O + phospholipid in  ADP + phosphate + phospholipid out

The 3 substrates of this enzyme are ATP, H2O, and phospholipid, whereas its 3 products are ADP, phosphate, and phospholipid.

This enzyme belongs to the family of hydrolases, specifically those acting on acid anhydrides to catalyse transmembrane movement of substances. The systematic name of this enzyme class is ATP phosphohydrolase (phospholipid-flipping). Other names in common use include Mg2+-ATPase, flippase, and aminophospholipid-transporting ATPase.

References

 
 
 
 

EC 3.6.3
Enzymes of unknown structure